Mancisidor is a Spanish surname. Notable people with the surname include:

Alejo Mancisidor (born 1970), Spanish tennis player
Jaime Mancisidor (1910–?), Spanish footballer
José Mancisidor (1894–1956), Mexican writer, historian and politician
Xabier Mancisidor (born 1970), Spanish footballer and coach

Spanish-language surnames